NLG may refer to:

 Dutch guilder, former currency with the ISO 4217 code "NLG"
 Natural language generation
 National Lawyers Guild
 Next Level Games
 Next Level Gaming
 Nose Landing Gear